The Dutch East Indies was a Dutch colony consisting of what is now Indonesia. It was divided into three governorates, namely the Great East, Borneo (Kalimantan) and Sumatra, and into three provinces in Java. Provinces and governorates were further divided into residencies. Residencies under the provinces were divided into regencies, and residencies under governorates were divided into departments (modern spelling ) and then further into . 

The following list is the divisions of the Dutch East Indies in 1942, prior to the Japanese occupation in World War 2.

Governorate of Sumatra
In 1938, all of the various Residencies and Gouvernements in Sumatra were reorganized under the new Gouvernement of Sumatra.

Java
Java comprised three provinces, West, Middle and East Java, the boundaries of which were similar to the island's pre-2000 boundaries.

West Java
Under control of Governorate of West Java (Gouvernement West-Java)

Central Java
Under control of Governorate of Middle Java (Gouvernement Midden-Java):

East Java
Under control of Governorate of East Java (Gouvernement Oost-Java):

Borneo
In 1938 both of these Residencies were again united in a Governorate of Borneo (Gouvernement van Borneo) with its capital at Banjarmasin.

The Great East

The governorate of the Great East (Dutch: 'Gouvernement Groote Oost') was created in 1938. It comprised the islands to the east of Borneo and Java, including the Lesser Sunda Islands, Sulawesi, Maluku and Western New Guinea.

Lesser Sunda Islands

Sulawesi

Maluku and Western New Guinea

Vorstenlanden
Vorstenlanden were four native states on the island of Java in the Netherlands Indies that were nominally self-governing under suzerainty of the Kingdom of the Netherlands. Their political autonomy was however severely constrained by treaties and settlements.

References

 
19th century in Indonesia
20th century in Indonesia
States and territories established in 1800
States and territories disestablished in 1949